Jalte Badan is a 1973 Hindi-language drama film about the perils of drug addiction. The film is directed and produced by Ramanand Sagar.

Plot
Kiran (Kiran Kumar) is a young man who goes to Bombay to study. While his university is caught up in a student strike, Kiran descends into drug use, encouraged by an evil mobster and the peer pressure of his fellow students. Kiran's only hope is that a kindly cabaret dancer Malti (Padma Khanna) will take pity on him and call for his snake charmer girlfriend Ganga (Kumkum) to rescue him with her true love.

Cast
Kiran Kumar as Kiran
Kumkum as Ganga
Padma Khanna as Malti
V K Sharma
Javed Khan Amrohi as a college student
Tun Tun as Chameli
Pradeep Kumar
Raza Murad

Music
Music for the film was by Laxmikant–Pyarelal and lyrics were written by Maya Govind.

References

External links
 
 Filmi Girl's Review

1973 films
1970s Hindi-language films
1973 drama films
Films scored by Laxmikant–Pyarelal
Films about drugs
Films set in Mumbai
Films directed by Ramanand Sagar
Films about heroin addiction